|}

This is a list of electoral district results for the Victorian 1950 election.

Results by electoral district

Albert Park

Allandale

Ballarat

Barwon

Benalla

Benambra

Bendigo

Borung

Box Hill

Brighton

Brunswick

Camberwell

Carlton

Caulfield

Clifton Hill

Coburg

Collingwood

Dandenong

Dundas

Elsternwick

Essendon

Evelyn

Footscray

Geelong

Gippsland East

Gippsland North

Gippsland South

Gippsland West

Glen Iris

Goulburn

Grant

Hampden

Hawthorn

Ivanhoe

Kew

Korong

Malvern

Melbourne

Mentone

Mernda

Midlands

Mildura

Moonee Ponds

Mornington

Murray Valley

Northcote

Oakleigh

Polwarth

Portland

Port Melbourne

Prahran

Preston

Rainbow

Richmond

Ripon

Rodney

St Kilda

Scoresby

Shepparton

Sunshine

Swan Hill

Toorak

Warrnambool

Williamstown

Wonthaggi

See also 

 1950 Victorian state election
 Members of the Victorian Legislative Assembly, 1950–1952

References 

Results of Victorian state elections
1950s in Victoria (Australia)